Cashplus, a product brand of Advanced Payment Solutions (APS), is a provider of prepaid MasterCards and current account for consumers, small businesses and local government authorities in the UK . 

Introduced in September 2005, Cashplus was one of the first prepaid credit cards to be launched in the UK.  As of 2008, it was Europe's leading MasterCard-based prepaid service.

See also
 Payoneer, a MasterCard-based Internet payment service
 Post Office Money, a provider of credit cards, current accounts, prepaid cards and other financial services, operated by Post Office Ltd

References

Credit cards
Credit card issuer associations